Herschel Amos Caldwell (August 13, 1903 – July 31, 1989) was a college football player and coach.

University of Alabama
Caldwell was a prominent end and fullback for Wallace Wade's Alabama Crimson Tide of the University of Alabama.

1925
He was a member of the first Southern team to win a Rose Bowl in 1925.

1926
He was selected All-Southern in 1926.  Caldwell made the extra point to tie Stanford in the Rose Bowl the next year. Caldwell was called by one source "one of the greatest defensive backs the South has produced in years." He also caught many balls thrown by Hoyt Winslett.

Coaching career

Sidney Lanier High
He later coached, first at Sidney Lanier High School.

Duke
Caldwell then coached under his former mentor Wade as an assistant at Duke.  He remained in this capacity in one form or another, working from freshman coach to varsity end coach, for forty years.

References

Duke Blue Devils football coaches
Alabama Crimson Tide football players
1903 births
1989 deaths
American football ends
American football placekickers
All-Southern college football players
People from Iron County, Missouri
Players of American football from Missouri
American football fullbacks
American football defensive backs